Nena Manach Goodman (1910 - March 19, 1998) was an artist, arts' patron, and philanthropist. She specialized in the painting of oil miniatures. Goodman's husband, Andrew Goodman, was the owner and chairman of New York department store Bergdorf Goodman. Nena managed Nena's Choice Gallery located on the fourth floor of the store of the store.

Biography 
Nena Goodman was born Nena Manach in Tembleque, Spain and raised in Cuba. She met her husband, Andrew, in 1935.

Goodman was an artist who specialized in the painting of oil miniatures of flowers and buildings. Her paintings often measured one inch by one inch.

Nena managed Nena's Choice Gallery, a space within Bergdorf Goodman where she exhibited the work of young artists. Her husband was owner and chairman of the store having taken over from his father, Edwin, the store's founder.

Nena, her husband, and their children maintained a home in Rye, New York, and a penthouse apartment located on the top floor of Bergdorf Goodman.

Goodman died March 19, 1998, at the age of 88.

References

External links 
 Photograph of Nena Goodman by Alexis Rodríguez-Duarte, National Portrait Gallery

1910 births
1998 deaths
Painters from New York City
Cuban emigrants to the United States
Spanish emigrants to Cuba